Balázs Major (born 18 December 1990 in Budapest) is a Hungarian former competitive ice dancer. With Dóra Turóczi, he is the 2014 national champion. They competed in the final segment at two World Junior Championships, finishing 12th in 2010. They also appeared at two World Championships, two European Championships, and two senior Grand Prix events.

They were coached by Ilona Berecz in Budapest, and by Muriel Zazoui and Olivier Schoenfelder in Lyon, France.

Programs

With Moscheni

With Turóczi

Competitive highlights 
GP: Grand Prix; CS: Challenger Series; JGP: Junior Grand Prix

With Moscheni

With Turóczi

References

External links 

 

1990 births
Living people
Figure skaters from Budapest
Hungarian male ice dancers
Competitors at the 2013 Winter Universiade
Competitors at the 2011 Winter Universiade